Maroof Yusuf (born 20 December 1992) is a Nigerian-born Burkinabé footballer who plays for Al Mokawloon on loan from Zamalek as a midfielder.

Early life 
Yussuf was born in Kwara state, Nigeria, where he attended the Government Secondary School, Ilorin

Club career
Yussuf played for Egyptian clubs Ittihad El Shorta and Zamalek before moving to Al-Fateh of the Saudi Professional League in July 2018.

International career
Maarouf is of Burkinabé descent. He played for Burkina Faso on 14 November 2012 in a 1–0 friendly win against DR Congo. In May, 2017, he was called up to Nigeria's squad for of the 2019 Africa Cup of Nations qualifiers match against South Africa

In July 2018 he began the process of obtaining Egyptian nationality.

Honours

Club
Zamalek SC
Egyptian Premier League: 2014–15
Egypt Cup: 2015, 2016, 2018
Egyptian Super Cup: 2016
Al-Shorta
 Iraqi Premier League: 2018–19

References

External links

1992 births
Living people
Nigerian people of Burkinabé descent
Sportspeople of Burkinabé descent
Nigerian footballers
Citizens of Burkina Faso through descent
Burkinabé footballers
Association football midfielders
Egyptian Premier League players
Kwara United F.C. players
Ittihad El Shorta SC players
Zamalek SC players
Al-Shorta SC players
Al Mokawloon Al Arab SC players
Burkina Faso international footballers
Nigerian expatriate footballers
Burkinabé expatriate footballers
Nigerian expatriate sportspeople in Egypt
Burkinabé expatriate sportspeople in Egypt
Expatriate footballers in Egypt
Nigerian expatriate sportspeople in Iraq
Burkinabé expatriate sportspeople in Iraq
Expatriate footballers in Iraq
21st-century Burkinabé people